is a horizontally scrolling shooter released as a coin-op by Jaleco in 1989. Ports to several home computer systems were published by Storm Entertainment in 1990. On February 6, 2020, Saint Dragon was released as part of Hamster's Arcade Archives lineup for the Nintendo Switch and PlayStation 4.

Gameplay

In Saint Dragon, the player controls the cyborg Saint Dragon, who has rebelled against the tyrannical Monster Cyborg army. Saint Dragon is initially armed with plasma bolts and a fiery breath. By collecting tokens, the dragon's firepower can be upgraded with pulse torpedoes, a laser, bouncing bombs, ring lasers or a turret. Other tokens can upgrade the dragon's speed, weapon power, or initiate a "hyper" mode which endows maximum firepower and invulnerability. In addition, the dragon has an armoured tail which follows the player's movement, allowing it to be used as a defensive shield.

There are five levels, each culminating in a battle with a large end-of-level guardian.

Ports
Storm were a software development team for The Sales Curve (Silkworm, The Ninja Warriors), who were affiliated with Accolade. The conversion project was managed by Dan Marchant, with programming by Andrew Taylor, music by Tony Williams, and graphics by Sean McClurg. Before working on the ZX Spectrum conversion, Taylor spent two weeks reading reviews of other scrolling games and studied videos of the arcade board gameplay. He noted several challenges: "There are some huge sprites in here, some half the size of the screen, which use up a vast amount of memory. The other thing is that in St Dragon each alien seems to make a much more complicated series of moves than in, say, R-Type, so we've got to try and reproduce them all, which is pretty complicated." He also wanted to achieve smooth scrolling, rather than the by-character-block movement in R-Type, without sacrificing speed. A method called "pre-shifts" was eventually used, in which several versions of a sprite are held in memory, each in a slightly different position, then cycled through to give the appearance of smooth movement. This used up more memory, so he restricted the game to the 128K models of Spectrum. The larger sprites, such as the leaping Puma, were handled by dividing them into strips of separate but co-ordinated entities.

Reception
In Japan, Game Machine listed Saint Dragon on their April 1, 1989 issue as being the sixth-most-successful table arcade unit at the time.

The ZX Spectrum conversion was well-received on its initial release. CRASH awarded it 92%, finding the dragon theme to be a refreshing change in the genre. The graphics were highlighted as well-animated, smooth and colourful. Your Sinclair awarded 80%, criticizing the uneven difficulty and low number of levels but praising it as "pretty, tough and a blast-a-minute".

On its budget re-release in 1992, Your Sinclair adjusted their rating to just 29%, criticizing it as "hideously slow, graphically abysmal, impossibly tedious load of old junk". Stuart Campbell took issue with the cassette multi-load, the invisible border on the reduced playing area, and frame-rate drop when multiple sprites are on-screen.

References

External links
Saint Dragon at Atari Mania
Interview with Amiga programmer John Croudy

1989 video games
Video games about dragons
Horizontally scrolling shooters
Arcade video games
Amiga games
Atari ST games
ZX Spectrum games
Amstrad CPC games
Commodore 64 games
Nintendo Switch games
PlayStation 4 games
TurboGrafx-16 games
Science fiction video games
Single-player video games
Video games about cyborgs
MSX games
Jaleco games
NMK (company) games
Hamster Corporation games
Hamster Corporation franchises